The  is a skyscraper located in the Nishi-Shinjuku business district in Shinjuku, Tokyo, Japan. Construction of the 209-metre, 50-storey skyscraper was finished in 1978. The building has a free observation deck on the top floor.

Tenants
Keihin Corporation, an automotive components manufacturer has its global headquarters in the building.

References

External links

  

Office buildings completed in 1978
Skyscrapers in Shinjuku
Skyscraper office buildings in Tokyo